The 2019–20 REMA 1000-ligaen is the 53rd season of REMA 1000-ligaen, Norway's premier handball league.

Team information 
A total of 12 teams will be participating in the 2019/20 edition of REMA 1000-ligaen. 9 teams were qualified directly from the 2018/19 season. The three top ranked teams from the 1. divisjon, Sola HK, Aker Topphåndball and Follo HK were promoted to REMA 1000-ligaen.

Regular season
The season was stopped on 12 March 2020.

Standings

Championship playoffs
Cancelled due to the COVID-19 pandemic.

Awards

All Star Team and other awards 
The All Star Team and other awards were announced on 9 June 2020.

Season statistics

Top goalscorers

Regular season

Relegation playoff
Cancelled due to the COVID-19 pandemic.

References

External links
 Norwegian Handball Federaration 

Eliteserien
Eliteserien
Eliteserien